Events in the year 1836 in Belgium.

Incumbents
Monarch: Leopold I
Prime Minister: Barthélémy de Theux de Meylandt

Events
15 March – Annual general meeting of the Banque de Belgique, founded the previous year.
30 March – Law on municipalities of Belgium passed: mayors and aldermen to be appointed by the crown from among those elected to the local council; crown cannot disband local councils.
30 April – Law on provinces of Belgium passes: provincial governors appointed by the crown; crown cannot disband provincial councils.
2 May – Parliament empowers government to raise 6 million francs for road-building.
27 May – Postal convention with the Kingdom of France signed in Brussels (to enter into force 29 June).
18 June – Belgium adopts metric system.
29 September - Provincial elections
31 October – Provincial Council of Hainaut approves the foundation of the École des Mines de Mons.
4 November – Jan Frans Willems and Jean-Baptist David found Flemish literary society Maetschappij tot Bevordering der Vlaemsche Tael en Letterkunde.

Publications
Periodicals
Almanach de poche de Bruxelles (Brussels, M.-E. Rampelbergh)
Bulletins de l'Académie royale des sciences, des lettres et des beaux-arts de Belgique, vol. 3 (Brussels, M. Hayez)
 Journal historique et littéraire, vol. 3 (Liège, P. Kersten).
Messager des sciences et des arts, vol. 4 (Ghent, Léonard Hebbelynck)

Monographs and reports
 Pasinomie: collection complète des lois, décrets, arrêtés et réglements généraux qui peuvent être invoqués en Belgique
L. Alvin, Compte-rendu du salon d'exposition de Bruxelles, 1836 (Brussels, J. P. Meline)
Charles de Brouckère and F. Tielemans, Répertoire de l'administration et du droit administratif de la Belgique, Vol. 3 (Brussels, Weissenbruch)
Zoé de Gamond, Des devoirs des femmes et des moyens les plus propres d'assurer leur bonheur (Brussels, L. Hauman)
Joseph Jean De Smet, Coup-d'oeil sur l'histoire ecclésiastique dans les premières années du XIXe siècle (Ghent)

Art and architecture

Paintings
 Antoine Wiertz, The Greeks and the Trojans Fighting over the Body of Patroclus

Buildings
 Auguste Payen, Porte de Namur tollbooths, Brussels

Births
3 March – Léonie de Waha, feminist (died 1926)
29 March – Léon d'Andrimont, politician (died 1905)
17 May – Virginie Loveling, author and poet (died 1923)
9 June – Guillaume Vogels, painter (died 1896)
12 June – Bernardine Hamaekers, soprano (died 1912)
9 July – Camille of Renesse-Breidbach, entrepreneur (died 1904)
23 August – Marie Henriette of Austria, Queen of the Belgians (died 1902)
10 November – Julius Vuylsteke, poet-politician (died 1903)
15 December – Edmond Picard, jurist (died 1924)

Deaths
27 October – Joséphine-Rosalie de Walckiers (born 1765), composer
7 November – Philippe-Charles Schmerling (born 1791), palaeontologist

References

 
1830s in Belgium